Gangi is a town in the Uttarakhand state of India.

Gangi borders the Indian cities of Gangotri and Kedarnath.  The Indian name, Gangi, is another name for the revered Hindu goddess Durga.

References

Cities and towns in Tehri Garhwal district